Veraguas C.D. is a Panamanian football team playing at the Liga Panameña de Fútbol. It is based in Santiago de Veraguas and it has been in the LPF League since the 2021 season, part of the league's twelve team expansion project.

History
The club was founded in 2005 by the Sindicato Único Nacional de Trabajadores de la Industria de la Construcción y Similares de Panamá (SUNTRACS).

In 2010 SUNTRACS was promoted to the Liga Nacional de Ascenso after defeating Los Pumas 5–0 in the Copa Rommel Fernández final. During their first season in the second division they were able to play the promotion playoff against Colón C-3 after defeating Independiente in penalties during the 2011 Clausura final. Unfortunately for the sindicalistas, they were defeated 2–0 and remained in the second division. They were 2014 Apertura champions, but in summer 2015 they were again beaten in the overall championship final, losing 3–0 to Atlético Nacional.

Honours
Liga Nacional de Ascenso: 0
Runner-up (1): 2010–11

Copa Rommel Fernández: 1
2010

List of Coaches
 Isaac Jové (January 2021 - Present)

Futsal
SUNTRACS also has a futsal team that plays in the Liga Elite de Fútbol Sala de Panamá (LEFP) where it enjoys a lot of success.

References

External links
 LEFP team profile

Football clubs in Panama
Association football clubs established in 2005
2005 establishments in Panama

England